This page lists the World Best Year Performance in the year 1997 in both the men's and the women's hammer throw. The main event during this season were the 1997 World Athletics Championships in Athens, Greece, where the final of the men's competition was held on Sunday August 3, 1997.

Men

Records

1997 World Year Ranking

Women

Records

1997 World Year Ranking

References
tilastopaja
apulanta
apulanta
digilander.libero
IAAF
hammerthrow.wz

1997
Hammer Throw Year Ranking, 1997